Martina De Memme (born 7 August 1991) is an Italian swimmer. She competed in the women's 4 × 200 metre freestyle relay event at the 2016 Summer Olympics.

References

External links
 

1991 births
Living people
Italian female long-distance swimmers
Italian female freestyle swimmers
Mediterranean Games gold medalists for Italy
Mediterranean Games medalists in swimming
Olympic swimmers of Italy
Sportspeople from Livorno
Swimmers at the 2013 Mediterranean Games
Swimmers at the 2016 Summer Olympics
Medalists at the 2013 Summer Universiade
Medalists at the 2015 Summer Universiade
Universiade medalists in swimming
Universiade gold medalists for Italy
Universiade bronze medalists for Italy
21st-century Italian women